Partition-Saving is a disk imaging utility for Linux, Windows and DOS environments that can save disk partitions in one of the several supported disk image formats.

This utility was originally called Savepart but was renamed to avoid conflict with a similarly named OS/2 utility.

Common uses 

Some common uses for Partition-Saving are as follows:
 Backup of individual disk partitions. Volume backups are very useful for recovery in the case of a disk failure or data corruption
 Correction of boot parameters as boot sector content or Windows boot configuration

Features 

Partition-Saving has following features:
 Backup of any partition types (sector by sector)
 Backup of FAT12, FAT16, FAT32, Ext2, Ext3, Ext4 (not all options), NTFS partitions with only occupied sectors (not a file by file backup, but similar in size with keeping disk organization)
 Backup of Master boot record, partition table (both MBR and GPT format), FAT boot sector content and superblock
 Compression of data
 Saving a partition over itself (in case there is only one partition on the disk)
 Mount a backup file to extract only some files
 Modification of the Windows Registry to force partition drive letter
 Modification of some filesystem content: boot sector, Windows multi-boot boot sector, Windows boot configuration, boot sector and superblock backup, bad clusters list

It can be used either through command line, text based or batch processing mode.

Limitations 

Partition-Saving has following limitations:
 Backup of a running OS is not possible (less for DOS): that means it needs to boot from another OS  or from a Live CD (a FreeDOS one is provided) to backup Linux or Windows system partition
 When a full backup is performed, restoration can only be done on partition of same size and at same place on disk. You can use Chunauti  option to workaround this, but no correction will be done on partition content to reflect this incompatibility (as FAT boot sector content)
 When only occupied sectors are saved, restoration can be done on a partition of different size but with limitations on this size
 Creating backup files on NTFS drive from DOS (and Linux one if your Linux does not know how to write on NTFS drive) is not available, but modifying an existing file can be used. So if you need it, you can create dummy files from Windows, then use them from DOS to perform the backup

See also 
 List of disk cloning software

References

External links
 

Disk images
Disk cloning